Norma Alvares is an Indian lawyer, social worker and environmental activist.

Biography 

Born in a Mangalorean Catholic family, she graduated in law from St. Xavier's College, Mumbai and entered environmental activism. Norma Alvares is married to Claude Alvares, another Mangalorean Catholic activist and the couple currently lives in Parra, Goa with their three children, Rahul, Samir and Milind.

Under the aegis of the Goa Foundation that was started by her husband, she initiated a public interest litigation (PIL) in 1987 to save the sand dunes of Goa, the first ever PIL filed in the state. She has been involved in over 100 PILs and has served as an amicus curiae. Her efforts are reported in winning a favourable court order for blocking a DuPont factory and in another one which restricted the mining activities in Goa. She is the president of the Goa branch of People for Animals and is the founder of Other India Book Store and Other India Press. She was honored by the Government of India, in 2002, with the fourth highest Indian civilian award of Padma Shri. The Government of Goa honoured Alvares with the Yashadamini Puraskar in 2001.

References

External links
 
 

Recipients of the Padma Shri in social work
Scholars from Goa
St. Xavier's College, Mumbai alumni
Living people
Year of birth missing (living people)
20th-century Indian educational theorists
Social workers from Goa
Indian women environmentalists
Women educators from Goa
20th-century women educators
20th-century Indian women